José Espinoza may refer to:

 José Ángel Espinoza (1919–2015), Mexican film actor and songwriter
 Jose L. Espinoza (born 1969), jockey in American Thoroughbred horse racing
 José Espinoza (footballer) (born 1974), Peruvian football manager and former player
 José Espinoza (boxer) (born 1988), Venezuelan boxer

See also
 José Espinosa (disambiguation)